Alfred Karamuço (27 January 1943 in Korçë – 14 February 2012 in Tirana) was an Albanian politician, attorney, and judge. He graduated with a law degree from the University of Tirana in 1965. He worked in the Public Attorney District of Saranda, Erseka, Tirana, and then in the General Prosecutor's Office in Tirana. He was a lecturer in the Albanian Police Academia in 1987. In 1988, he started working as a legal adviser on juridical byro of the Council of Ministers in Tirana. In 1991, he became a Minister of State Control and the year after, he became the Deputy Head of Service Control of the State. Karamuço was part of the Central Head Council of Republican Party of Albania. In 1995, he started the 12 year mandate as a member of the Constitutional Court of Albania. He retired in 2007. He is married to Valentina Karamuço, with whom he has three children.

References

External links 

 Constitutional Court of the Republic of Albania

Albanian politicians
1943 births
2012 deaths
Date of death missing
Place of death missing
People from Korçë
University of Tirana alumni
20th-century Albanian judges
Constitutional Court of Albania
21st-century Albanian judges